Roussin de Morgex (sometimes known as Rossano Rosso in Italy) is an Italian grape variety, native to the western part of Valle d'Aosta in the municipality of Morgex. It is a pink-skinned teinturier grape that produced a light pink juice. Although it may by used as one of the autochthonous varieties allowed in the red DOC wine from the region, Valle d'Aosta Rosso, in 2010 it was not cultivated commercially; according to wine writer Ian D'Agata nobody had made wine from it in 300 years. Since then, small experimental plantings have been made, and a subsequent 20 bottle batch of pink sparkling wine produced by Cave Mont Blanc in 2014 showed sufficient promise to spur further research and planting.

Origin 

Roussin de Morgex belongs to a group of grape varieties geographically isolated in the Alpine regions of Italy and Valais, in Switzerland. DNA analyses suggest that while unrelated to Roussin, it is related to the Prié variety, and more distantly to Rèze, from the Swiss Alps.

Further reading 

 Giulio Moriondo: Vini et Vitigni Autoctoni della Valle d'Aosta. (139 pages). Institut Agricole Régional, Aosta 1999. 
 Roussin de Morgex in the Vitis International Variety Catalog.

References 

Red wine grape varieties
Wine grapes of Italy